Andros Town is a town in North Andros and capital of Andros Island in the Bahamas.

The town had a population of 386 in 2010 (greater area).

Transportation
The area is served by Andros Town International Airport.

See also
 Districts of the Bahamas
 Islands of the Bahamas
 List of cities in the Bahamas

References

Populated places in the Bahamas
Andros, Bahamas